Sir Milton Sheridan Sharp, 1st Baronet (30 January 1856 – 22 May 1924) was an English dyer.

Sharp was born to a wealthy family in Wyke, Yorkshire. He was educated at Shrewsbury School and Trinity Hall, Cambridge. He was chairman of the Bradford Dyers' Association from its incorporation in December 1898 until his death. He was created a baronet in the 1920 Birthday Honours.

Footnotes

References
Obituary, The Times, 24 May 1924

1856 births
1924 deaths
Businesspeople from Bradford
Baronets in the Baronetage of the United Kingdom
People educated at Shrewsbury School
Alumni of Trinity Hall, Cambridge